Martin Ndongo Ebanga (born March 23, 1966) is a retired boxer from Cameroon.

He won the bronze medal in the men's lightweight division (– 60 kg) at the 1984 Summer Olympics in Los Angeles, California. He was defeated in the semifinals by eventual silver medalist Luis Ortiz of Puerto Rico. N'Dongo also competed at the 1988 Summer Olympics in Seoul, South Korea, where he was eliminated in the second round.

Olympic results
1st round bye
Defeated Shadrah Odhiambo (Sweden) RSC 2
Defeated Gordon Carew (Guyana) KO 2
Defeated Fahri Sumer (Turkey) 4-1
Lost to Luis Ortiz (Puerto Rico) 2-3

External links
 databaseOlympics.com

1966 births
Living people
Lightweight boxers
Boxers at the 1984 Summer Olympics
Boxers at the 1988 Summer Olympics
Olympic boxers of Cameroon
Olympic bronze medalists for Cameroon
Olympic medalists in boxing
Cameroonian male boxers
Medalists at the 1984 Summer Olympics
20th-century Cameroonian people